The Oakland County Board of Commissioners is a legislative body made up of 19 commissioners who are elected by district. Oakland County, which abuts the city of Detroit, is Michigan's second-largest county with a population of 1.3 million residents. The county board sets policy and laws for the county regarding property, public health services, public safety, and maintenance of county highways. It is presided over by its chair, currently Dave Woodward.

Elections
The board's nineteen commissioners are elected from individual constituencies for two-year terms (four-year terms beginning in 2025), with elections for all constituencies held during United States presidential elections.

Commissioners

Current
This is a list of the Oakland County Commissioners in order by district. This list is current as of January 2023.

See also

 Dave Coulter

References

Oakland County, Michigan